Dongming Road is an interchange station on Lines 6 and 13 of the Shanghai Metro. It began services on 29 December 2007 as a Line 6 station. It became an interchange station on 30 December 2018 with the arrival of Line 13 as part of its phase two and three extensions.

Station Layout

References 

Railway stations in Shanghai
Line 6, Shanghai Metro
Line 13, Shanghai Metro
Shanghai Metro stations in Pudong
Railway stations in China opened in 2007